Anomalostomyia is a genus of tachinid flies in the family Tachinidae.

Species
Anomalostomyia namibica Cerretti & Barraclough, 2007

Distribution
Namibia.

References

Exoristinae
Diptera of Africa
Tachinidae genera
Monotypic Brachycera genera